Alan Gordon Barraclough Haselhurst, Baron Haselhurst,  (born 23 June 1937) is a British Conservative Party politician who served as Member of Parliament (MP) for Saffron Walden from 1977 to 2017, having previously represented Middleton and Prestwich from 1970 to 1974. Haselhurst was Chairman of Ways and Means from 14 May 1997 to 8 June 2010, and later Chairman of the Commonwealth Parliamentary Association between 2011 and 2014. He was the oldest Conservative MP when he stood down at the 2017 general election. In May 2018, he was appointed as a life peer, and currently sits in the House of Lords as Baron Haselhurst.

Early life and career

Alan Gordon Barraclough Haselhurst was born at South Elmsall, near Hemsworth, Yorkshire and educated at King Edward's School, Birmingham, then Cheltenham College in Gloucestershire, before going to Oriel College, Oxford.

He was elected President of the Oxford University Conservative Association in 1958 and, for two years, served as Secretary and Treasurer of the Oxford Union from 1959. Before his election to Parliament, he worked in management in the chemicals industry and became an unremunerated director when his father's pharmacy was incorporated.

Haselhurst was the election agent to Robin Balniel, Conservative MP for Hertford, at both the 1964 and 1966 general elections. Haselhurst was also elected Chairman of the National Young Conservatives in 1964, serving for two years before becoming Chairman of the Commonwealth Youth Exchange Council (1978–1981).

Parliamentary career

1970–1997
Haselhurst was elected to the House of Commons at the 1970 general election for the Lancashire seat of Middleton and Prestwich, defeating the sitting Labour MP Denis Coe by 1,042 votes. In Parliament, he briefly served from 1973 as Parliamentary Private Secretary (PPS) to the Home Secretary Robert Carr, prior to losing his seat in February 1974. Haselhurst lost the seat to Labour by only 517 votes; he then served as the Chairman of the Manchester Youth and Community Service from 1974 until he returned to Parliament. The Conservative MP for the Essex seat of Saffron Walden, Sir Peter Kirk, died on 17 April 1977. Haselhurst was selected to contest the resulting by-election on 7 July. Haselhurst retained the seat with a majority of 12,437, and was returned as the constituency's MP at every following election until his retirement in 2017.

Following the Conservatives return to power at the 1979 general election, Haselhurst was appointed as PPS to the Secretary of State for Education and Science Mark Carlisle and served for two years from 1979. He served on the European Legislation Select Committee for fifteen years from 1982, and was a member of the Transport Select Committee from 1992 to 1997. He was invited to ask the first question in Margaret Thatcher's final Prime Minister's Questions on 27 November 1990.

1997–2017
Following the 1997 general election, Haselhurst was elected Chairman of Ways and Means (Deputy Speaker), remaining in that post under successive Speakers Betty Boothroyd, Michael Martin, and John Bercow until May 2010. Haselhurst was a nominated candidate to succeed Michael Martin after Martin's resignation as Commons Speaker on 19 May 2009. However, Haselhurst was among those who became embroiled in the MPs' expenses controversy being highlighted by The Daily Telegraph for claiming £12,000 in gardening expenses over four years, in the sum of £249 every month, despite receiving advice from the Fees Office to simplify the submission of his expenses in this way; he made endeavours to wipe the slate clean by refunding his gardening expenses "out of respect to his constituents", withdrawing from the Commons Speakership election having received 66 votes in the first round of voting, and 57 in the second.

Haselhurst chose not to seek re-election as a Commons Deputy Speaker after the 2010 general election, since, by convention, the Chairman of Ways and Means should come from a different party affiliation than that of the Speaker, he would only have been eligible to stand for First Deputy Chairman, junior to his previous office. Nevertheless, his fellow parliamentarians entrusted him to continue as Interim Deputy Speaker chairing debates in the House of Commons during the period between the State Opening of Parliament and its election of new Deputy Speakers. On 27 July 2010, Haselhurst was elected Chairman of the House of Commons Administration Committee, having been defeated in the election for Chair of the Backbench Business Committee by Natascha Engel.

In July 2010, Haselhurst became Chairman of the Commonwealth Parliamentary Association UK Branch before in the following year at the Commonwealth Parliamentary Conference at London in July 2011 being elected Chairman of the Commonwealth Parliamentary Association's Executive Committee, serving until October 2014, and overseeing parliamentary procedure throughout the Commonwealth. He succeeded the Malaysian Datuk Seri Haji Shafie Apdal; the previous British parliamentarian to be elected to this post was Sir Colin Shepherd in 1996.

Haselhurst was re-selected as the Conservative candidate for the next election at a meeting of the local party association on 13 February 2014, and re-elected at the 2015 general election. Haselhurst was opposed to Brexit prior to the 2016 referendum.

In April 2017, Haselhurst announced that he would not be contesting the 2017 general election, after initially announcing his intention to stand. Commenting on the reasons for changing his mind he stated, "I feel now that my initial instinctive response was premature... I have begun to recognize that it might test the friendship and goodwill of so many people whose support I have enjoyed if I sought to do so for a further five years."

2018–
On 18 May 2018, Haselhurst was nominated to join the House of Lords. On 22 June, he was created a life peer as Baron Haselhurst, of Saffron Walden in the County of Essex.

Personal life
Alan Haselhurst married Angela Margaret Bailey on 16 April 1977; the couple have two sons and a daughter. He is a supporter of community-based projects and was for a time a Director of Turning Point, a charity working with socially excluded young people, for five years from 1981. A Europhile, he is regarded as a one-nation Conservative and an ally of Kenneth Clarke.

He was knighted in 1995 and sworn of the Privy Council in 1999. He is the Secretary of the All-Party Parliamentary Group on Cricket, was a Council Member of Essex County Cricket Club from 1996 to 2008, and is a member of Marylebone Cricket Club, and writes cricketing stories.

Publications
 Occasionally Cricket: The Unpredictable Performances of the Outcasts CC by Alan Haselhurst, 1999, Queen Anne Press, 
 Eventually Cricket by Alan Haselhurst, 2001, Queen Anne Press 
 Incidentally Cricket by Alan Haselhurst, 2003, Queen Anne Press 
 Accidentally Cricket by Alan Haselhurst, 2009, The Professional & Higher Partnership, 
 Unusually Cricket by Alan Haselhurst, 2011, The Professional & Higher Partnership

References

External links
 
 
 
 
 

1937 births
Living people
People educated at King Edward's School, Birmingham
People educated at Cheltenham College
Alumni of Oriel College, Oxford
People from South Elmsall
Conservative Party (UK) life peers
Life peers created by Elizabeth II
Conservative Party (UK) MPs for English constituencies
Knights Bachelor
Members of the Privy Council of the United Kingdom
UK MPs 1970–1974
UK MPs 1974–1979
UK MPs 1979–1983
UK MPs 1983–1987
UK MPs 1987–1992
UK MPs 1992–1997
UK MPs 1997–2001
UK MPs 2001–2005
UK MPs 2005–2010
UK MPs 2010–2015
UK MPs 2015–2017
Deputy Speakers of the British House of Commons
Politicians awarded knighthoods
Presidents of the Oxford University Conservative Association